Sandra Cecchini and Patricia Tarabini won in the final 6–3, 7–6 against Mercedes Paz and Brenda Schultz.

Seeds
Champion seeds are indicated in bold text while text in italics indicates the round in which those seeds were eliminated. The top two seeded teams received byes into the quarterfinals.

 Mercedes Paz /  Brenda Schultz (final)
 Barbara Paulus /  Judith Wiesner (semifinals)
 Sandra Cecchini /  Patricia Tarabini (champions)
 Nicole Jagerman /  Sandra Wasserman (first round)

Draw

External links
 1989 Arcachon Cup Doubles Draw

Arcachon Cup
1989 WTA Tour